is a former Japanese football player, who last played for Fujieda MYFC as a forward.

Career
Already considered by Oita Trinita through its youth ranks, Miyoshi attended Osaka Kyoiku University before playing for Blaublitz Akita. After five seasons, he left Akita to join Fujieda MYFC in winter 2016.

Club statistics
Updated to 2 February 2018.

References

External links
Profile at Fujieda MYFC

1987 births
Living people
Osaka Kyoiku University alumni
Association football people from Nagasaki Prefecture
Japanese footballers
J3 League players
Japan Football League players
Blaublitz Akita players
Fujieda MYFC players
Association football forwards